Maggie Cheung Man-yuk (born 20 September 1964) is a Hong Kong former actress. Raised in Hong Kong and Britain, she started her career after placing second in 1983's Miss Hong Kong Pageant. She achieved critical success in the late 1980s and into the early 2000s, before taking a break from acting following her last starring role in 2004. She rarely makes public appearances except for fashion events and award ceremonies.

Cheung has won numerous accolades at home and abroad for her acting. She has won the Hong Kong Film Award for Best Actress 5 times in the span of 11 years from 1990 to 2001, and holds the record for most wins in that category. She also holds the record for most wins for the Golden Horse Award for Best Leading Actress in Taiwan, having won 4 times. In the West, she has been awarded the Silver Bear for Best Actress at Berlin International Film Festival in 1992 and Best Actress at Cannes Film Festival in 2004. In 2004, she became the first Asian actress to be nominated for the French César Award for Best Actress.

Her most acclaimed performances include As Tears Go By, Center Stage, Green Snake, Irma Vep, Comrades: Almost a Love Story, The Soong Sisters, Hero and Clean. The Wong Kar-wai–directed In the Mood for Love (2000), in which she plays a cheongsam-wearing character opposite male lead Tony Leung, is a classic in both the film and fashion worlds.

Early life and education
Maggie Cheung was born in Hong Kong on 20 September 1964 to Shanghainese parents. She attended St. Paul's Primary Catholic School in Happy Valley, where she began at the primary one level. Her family emigrated from Hong Kong to the United Kingdom when she was eight. She spent part of her childhood and adolescence in Bromley, London, England. She returned to Hong Kong at the age of 18 in 1982 for a vacation but ended up staying for modelling assignments and other commitments. She also briefly had a sales job at the Lane Crawford department store.

In 1983, Cheung entered the Miss Hong Kong pageant and won the first runner-up and the Miss Photogenic award as well. She was a semi-finalist in the Miss World pageant the same year. After two years as a TV presenter, it led to a contract with TVB (the television arm of the Shaw Bros. Studio).

Cheung is a polyglot as a result of her upbringing in Hong Kong and England and ten years' stay in Paris. In Center Stage, Cheung performed in Cantonese, Mandarin, and Shanghainese fluently, switching languages with ease. In Clean, she performed in fluent English, French, and Cantonese.

Career
Soon after her debut, Cheung broke into the film industry, starring in comedies. She caught the attention of Jackie Chan, who cast her in Police Story (1985) as May, his long-suffering girlfriend. The film was a huge hit and made Cheung a star overnight. TVB had also cast Barbara Yung and Kent Tong in a period drama, Kings of Ideas (橋王之王) but due to the death of Barbara Yung, the role was assigned to Cheung.

Despite her success, Cheung found herself typecast in the roles of comics or weak, clumsy women. Realizing this, Cheung wanted to break away by seeking more dramatic roles. She got this opportunity when Wong Kar-wai cast her in As Tears Go By (1988), her first of many collaborations with Wong. Cheung often cites the film as the piece that truly began her serious acting career, and she won critical praise for it. In 1989, she won Best Actress awards at the Golden Horse Award and Hong Kong Film Award for her work in Full Moon in New York and A Fishy Story respectively. In 1991, she became the first Chinese performer to win a Best Actress Award at the prestigious Berlin Film Festival for her work in Center Stage.

Cheung subsequently proved her versatility with roles in action films. Her performance in the sci-fi martial arts smash hit The Heroic Trio (1992) and its sequel, Executioners (1993), impressed both critics and audiences with her martial arts skills. Also in a departure from her usual roles, Cheung played a beautiful and vicious femme fatale in New Dragon Gate Inn (1992).

After taking a break in 1994, Cheung returned to film Olivier Assayas' Irma Vep (1996), which helped her break into the international scene. That same year, she won further acclaim for her work in the romantic film Comrades: Almost a Love Story, in which she played one of a pair of lovers kept apart for ten years by fate and circumstance. The following year, she made her first English-language film in Wayne Wang's  Chinese Box (1997). Cast as a mysterious young woman named Jean, Cheung held her own alongside the more internationally well-established stars, Jeremy Irons and Gong Li.

After her 1998 marriage with Olivier Assayas, Cheung stayed mainly in France. She returned to Hong Kong to film In the Mood for Love (2000), which won critical acclaim and a second Taiwanese Golden Horse award for Cheung. Thereafter, she starred in Zhang Yimou's Hero (2002) and Wong's 2046 (2004). She won the Best Actress award at the Cannes Film Festival for her role as a mother who tries to kick her drug habit and reconcile with her long-lost son in Clean (2004).

Cheung was a jury member at the 1997 Berlin Film Festival, the 1999 Venice Film Festival, the 2004 Hawaii International Film Festival, the 2007 Cannes Film Festival, and the 2010 Marrakech International Film Festival. And for the first time in its history, the 59th Cannes Film Festival (2006) used a photographic image of a real actress on its poster – that of Cheung.

On 7 February 2007, The New York Times rated Cheung as one of the 22 Great Performers in 2006 for her Cannes winning role as Emily in Clean. After 25 years of making movies, she decided to retire from acting to pursue a career as a film composer. She had mentioned she would like to compose music and paint after having fulfilled her acting potential. Her last film appearance was as Mazu, Chinese goddess of the sea, in the film Ten Thousand Waves (2010) by British filmmaker and installation artist Isaac Julien.

As UK's Independent puts it, since her Cannes moment in 2004, Cheung "turned her back on film" and has shifted her focus to philanthropy, making music, and editing. In April 2010, Cheung was appointed as UNICEF's Ambassador to China. In July 2011, she was awarded a doctor honoris causa at the University of Edinburgh. Cheung retired from acting in 2013 and has since kept a low profile.

Cheung has provided celebrity endorsement for Mandarin Oriental Hotel Group.

Post-retirement
In May 2014, Cheung performed at the 2014 Shanghai Strawberry Music Festival. In June 2019, during a guest appearance on Mango TV reality show  in which she mentored boyband Next, Cheung spoke frankly about her 2014 performance's poor reception.
 
In 2015, Cheung composed and performed the theme song "If You Were Gone" for the anthology film Cities in Love. According to producer Gu Xiaodong, Cheung dedicated almost half a year to producing the song.

In June 2022, Cheung performed a DJ set at the grand opening of a new Gucci store at The Landmark in Hong Kong.

Personal life
Cheung married French director Olivier Assayas in 1998; they divorced in 2001. She began a relationship with German architect Ole Scheeren in 2007, but the relationship ended in 2011.

Cheung has been rumoured to have been romantically involved with In the Mood for Love co-star Tony Leung, who is married to fellow actor Carina Lau. Lau quashed rumours of a feud by uploading a photo of her running into Cheung at an airport in 2013.

Filmography

Awards

Wins

Nominations

See also
Cinema of Hong Kong
Wong Kar-wai
Tony Leung Chiu Wai
Leslie Cheung

References

External links

 

1964 births
Living people
20th-century British actresses
20th-century Hong Kong actresses
21st-century British actresses
21st-century Hong Kong actresses
British actresses of Chinese descent
Cannes Film Festival Award for Best Actress winners
British film actresses
British television actresses
Hong Kong beauty pageant winners
Hong Kong emigrants to the United Kingdom
Hong Kong film actresses
Hong Kong television actresses
Miss World 1983 delegates
Naturalised citizens of the United Kingdom
People from Bromley
Silver Bear for Best Actress winners
UNICEF Goodwill Ambassadors